Johannes "Hannes" Jacobus Gerhardu Dreyer (born 13 January 1985) is a South African sprinter who specializes in the 100 metres.

Dreyer represented South Africa at the 2008 Summer Olympics in Beijing. He competed at the 4x100 metres relay together with Leigh Julius, Ishmael Kumbane and Thuso Mpuang. In their qualification heat they did not finish due to a mistake in the baton exchange and they were eliminated.

Education
He is a student at the University of Pretoria.

Achievements

Personal bests
Outdoor
100 metres - 10.24 (2008)
200 metres - 20.71 (2008)

Indoor
60 metres - 6.66 (2009)

References

External links

1985 births
Living people
University of Pretoria alumni
South African male sprinters
Olympic athletes of South Africa
Athletes (track and field) at the 2008 Summer Olympics
Universiade medalists in athletics (track and field)
Universiade gold medalists for South Africa
Universiade silver medalists for South Africa
Medalists at the 2007 Summer Universiade
Medalists at the 2011 Summer Universiade